Montreal River  is a river in the Canadian province of Saskatchewan. It flows  from Montreal Lake to Lac la Ronge and is part of the Churchill River and Hudson Bay drainage basins. Along its course, Montreal River runs through boreal forests, muskeg, and glacier formed valleys. Within its watershed are the Waskesiu Uplands, much of Prince Albert National Park, and several notable lakes, such as Waskesiu, Kingsmere, Crean, Weyakwin, and Bittern.

Course
It heads north and passes under at Highway 2 at the site of the Montreal River Recreation Site. The river continues north, passes under Highway 165, heads east through Partridge Crop Lake and Sikachu Lake and enters Egg Lake at Wawe Bay. It continues east through Bigstone Lake, passes again under Highway 2, and reaches its mouth at Lac la Ronge between the communities of La Ronge and Air Ronge.

Montreal River Recreation Site 
Montreal River Recreation Site  is a provincial recreation site along the course of the Montreal River. It is a small roadside pull-out campground off of Highway 2 with six campsites.

Fish species 
The fish species include walleye, sauger, yellow perch, northern pike, lake trout, lake whitefish, cisco, burbot, white sucker, and longnose sucker.

See also 
List of rivers of Saskatchewan
Hudson Bay drainage basin

References 

Rivers of Saskatchewan
Tributaries of Hudson Bay